William Henry Hare Hedges-White, 3rd Earl of Bantry (10 November 1801 – 15 January 1884) was an Anglo-Irish Conservative peer.

He was the second son of Richard White, 1st Earl of Bantry and Lady Margaret Anne Hare. In 1840 he took the additional surname of Hedges after inheriting the estates of his great-uncle, Robert Hedges Eyre. He served as High Sheriff of County Cork in 1848. He succeeded his elder brother as Earl of Bantry following his death in 1868. On 6 July 1869 Lord Bantry was elected as an Irish representative peer and took his seat in the House of Lords.

On 16 Apr 1845 he married Jane Herbert, and together they had six children. His daughter Olivia Charlotte married Arthur Guinness. He died in 1884 and was succeeded by his only son, William Hedges-White.

Children 

 Lady Elizabeth Mary Gore Hedges-White (1847– 1880)
 Emily Anne Hedges-White, (d.1860)
 Lady Olivia Charlotte Hedges-White, (1850– 1925).
 Lady Ina Maude Hedges-White, (1852– 1907)
 William Henry Hare Hedges-White, 4th and Last Earl of Bantry
 Lady Jane Frances Anna Hedges-White, (1857– 1946)

References

1801 births
1884 deaths
19th-century Anglo-Irish people
Conservative Party (UK) hereditary peers
Earls in the Peerage of Ireland
High Sheriffs of County Cork
Irish representative peers